Black Girl is a 1966 French-Senegalese film by writer/director Ousmane Sembène, starring Mbissine Thérèse Diop. Its original French title is La noire de… [la nwaʁ də], which means "the black girl/woman of…," as in "someone's black girl" or "the black girl from…" The film centers on Diouana, a young Senegalese woman, who moves from Dakar, Senegal to Antibes, France to work for a French couple. In France, Diouana hopes to continue her former job as a nanny and anticipates a new cosmopolitan lifestyle. However, upon her arrival in Antibes, Diouana experiences harsh treatment from the couple, who force her to work as a servant. She becomes increasingly aware of her constrained and alienated situation and starts to question her life in France. The script is based on a short story from Sembène's 1962 collection Voltaique, which was in turn inspired by a real life incident. This was the director's first feature-length film. It is often considered the first Sub-Saharan African film by an African filmmaker to receive international attention.

Plot
The plot continually shifts back and forth between Diouana's present life in France where she works as a domestic servant, and flashbacks of her previous life in Senegal.

In the flashbacks, it is revealed that she comes from a poor village outside of Dakar. Most people are illiterate and Diouana would roam the city looking for a job. One day, the character of 'Madame' comes to the square looking for a servant and selects Diouana from amongst the unemployed women. Diouana was chosen because she does not aggressively demand a job like the other women; unlike the others, she did not crowd forward demanding a job. Initially, Madame hires Diouana to care for her children in Dakar. As a gift, Diouana gives her employers a traditional mask that she had bought from a small boy for 50 guineas, and they display it in their home. When Diouana is not working she goes for walks with her boyfriend. Monsieur and Madame then offer Diouana a job working for them in France. Diouana is thrilled, and immediately begins dreaming of her new life in France.

Once she arrives, Diouana is overwhelmed with cooking and cleaning for the rich couple and their friends. Madame treats her unkindly, and Diouana is confused as to her role. She thought that she would be caring for the children as in Senegal, and would be able to go outside and discover France. Yet, in France, her character does not leave the apartment, cooking and cleaning the house - a clear contrast to her previous life in Senegal where she spent much time outdoors. When Diouana works, she wears a fancy dress and heels. The mistress of the house tells her to remove them, telling her "don't forget that you are a maid". At one of the couple's dinner parties, one of their friends kisses Diouana in typical European fashion on the cheeks, explaining "I've never kissed a black girl before!"

Diouana receives a letter from her mother, which Monsieur reads to her. Diouana's mother asks why she has not heard from her daughter, and asks for money. Diouana rips the letter up. Madame doesn't let her sleep in past breakfast time, and yells at her to get to work. Diouana attempts to take back the mask she gave to Madame, and a struggle ensues. Madame tells Diouana that, if she does not work, she cannot eat. Diouana refuses to work. Then, after Monsieur attempts to pay her salary and Diouana refuses to accept her pay, in an unexpected plot twist that is the climax of the film, Diouana commits suicide by slitting her throat in the bathtub of the family's home. The film ends with Monsieur journeying to Senegal to return Diouana's suitcase, mask, and money to her family. He offers Diouana's mother money, but she refuses it. As Monsieur leaves the village, the little boy with the mask runs along behind him.

Cast
 Mbissine Thérèse Diop as Gomis Diouana
 Anne-Marie Jelinek as Madame
 Robert Fontaine as Monsieur
 Momar Nar Sene as Diouana's boyfriend

Themes
This film addresses the effects of colonialism and racism in Africa and Europe. These themes are highlighted through the recurring appearance of an African mask that Diouana gives to her employers on her first day of work at the house in Dakar. They initially put the mask with other pieces of African Art and, later in France, the mask is hung alone on the white wall in the French couple's apartment. The mask has different meanings: 
 Mainly, it represents Diouana; at the beginning, when she gives the mask to the French family, they put the mask between other native masks, as she is still in her homeland, surrounded by people that she knows and by a familiar environment. But when they move to France, the mask is alone on a white wall, like Diouana is alone in France, surrounded by white walls and white people.
 Also, means those African people that have to move from their homeland to Europe to seek their fortune, questioning the mobility, the 'visual hegemony' and the uprooting, the colonial dynamics and its legacies.
 Another analogy between the mask and Africa, for example in the last scene, when the white man is followed by the child wearing the mask, it represents the past of Africa that will always haunt its colonizers, but also means the uncertain future of Africa. 
 Furthermore, Diouana’s last act of defiance is very significant for the African status; Madame and Diouana are contending the mask as France, but more in general, Europe fought for its supremacy on African territories, but at the end the African territories during 20th century gained independence, as Diouana at the end of the fight got the mask. 
The mask is a symbol of unity and identity, but today for the non-Africans it is only a 'souvenir'.

As the film progresses, Diouana is shown as becoming increasingly depressed and lonely. Each day, her African identity deteriorates as she is seen as nothing but a servant to Madame. Theorists have explained that placing any human being in an inferior position in the context of discourse causes great mental strain. Fanon argues that it causes both the mind and body to feel inferior causing the colonized to feel less like a human being. This is the experience Diouana has. The film portrays how colonialism can break down an individual’s whole mindset, and cause them to face personal damage on top of the destruction already being caused through colonialism.

The concept of literacy is additionally a very valuable aspect of the portrayal of colonialism. Author Rachel Langford expresses its importance and the way Diouana’s identity is ripped from her. Due to her illiteracy, when a letter is sent to Diouana by her mother, Madame and Monsieur take it upon themselves to write Diouana’s response for her, asking her to correct them if they get anything wrong. While Diouana is suffering, they begin to express to her mother that she is having a lovely and fulfilling time in France. Diouana becomes enraged, narrating that this is not her letter, although not correcting the couple. This scenario is significant to the theme of colonialism as Diouana is not developing her own life and personality. It is created for her by the colonizer. The film shows the damage that colonialism can cause an individual.

In terms of its representation of racism, it is expressed through the relationship of Diouana and Madame. These characters represent the issue of power relations between Africa and the Western state. The beginning of the film shows a large group of women who wait on the side of the street every morning in hopes they will be hired. This simple scene immediately shows the power difference between the two states. Each of these women dreams of living a fantasy life when arriving in Europe, but are faced with a negative reality. When Diouana is hired and arrives in France, she discovers herself to be in isolation from the world around her and forced to face the issue of racism daily. Even when guests arrive at the house, she is put on show for the guests. Due to the colour of her skin and her country of origin, she is seen as a novelty, not a human to be cared for.

The film highlights societal hierarchy and how race is used to create this division. It is expressed that the social order can only be upheld with the cooperation of both the exploiter and the exploited. The only way to ensure the exploited is obliging is to break their spirit by breaking down their identity, specifically focusing on their race. This is a method used by many colonizers, and is depicted in this film.

Significance
In his 1997 book Movies as Politics, Jonathan Rosenbaum makes a case for Black Girl as the symbolic genesis of sub-Saharan African filmmaking, at least to the extent that the authorship belonged to a born and bred African.

In addition, the film, being from the perspective of a Senegalese female, acts as a rare reflection of the voices of the colonized. While Senegal had gained independence in 1960 (before the film takes place), colonial oppression still thrives throughout the film. This is seen in the objectification of Diouana and the suppression of her dreams and ambitions. She is objectified by Madame, who treats her as a servant, and several other characters including Madame’s friend that kisses Diouana on the cheeks in typical European greeting without asking. Her ambitions are suppressed by both Madame and Diouana’s lack of education and finances, although she refuses to accept her salary. Diouana dreams to go to the French shops, see the beautiful views, and live a luxurious lifestyle, but she does not have the resources to do so. She attempts to express some part of this dream by wearing dresses and heels while working; however, Madame yells at her to take off those clothes and reminds Diouana that she is a maid, so she has no need for such attire. In doing this, Madame suppresses Diouana’s dreams and hopes while asserting the inequality between their characters. To Diouana, France was supposed to be her chance at freedom, wealth, and happiness. Sembène reveals in his film that while Diouana (and the colonized) has the possibility right outside her door, quite literally, she will never be able to achieve her dreams due to the oppression of Madame (the colonizer) and the institutional discrimination embedded into society; and the colonizer offers this dream as a way to manipulate the colonized into being oppressed.

Reception
Critics in the US and Europe did not initially recognize Black Girl's lasting power. A 1969 New York Times review is lukewarm, expressing admiration for the film's "simplicity, sincerity and subdued anger toward the freed black man's new burdens," but finding fault in how it is "unevenly weighted" against the white couple, especially Monsieur, who the reviewer describes as "a gent who is confused but considerate." In a negative 1969 review, Roger Ebert describes the film as "slow and pedestrian." He also complains that "little attempt is made to get into the minds of the characters," particularly the white couple who employ the title character. A 1973 review in The Village Voice calls the film "overly didactic and melodramatic," but recognizes that it offers a valuable African perspective that resonates with audiences in former French colonies.

When critics revisited the film after its restoration in 2016, they found more to praise. In an article on the occasion of Black Girl's fiftieth anniversary, A. O. Scott of The New York Times describes the film as "at once powerfully of its moment and permanently contemporary," adding that "the force of Mr. Sembène’s art—the sheer beauty that is the most striking feature of his early films—lies in his humanism." In a 2017 essay for The Criterion Collection, Ashley Clark characterizes Black Girl as an "elegantly stark dramatization of postcolonial pain." She notes that the Madame would be the main character in a Eurocentric version of this story and but that "the focus has shifted entirely" by centering the experience of Diouana, who Clark describes as a "refreshingly multidimensional character." Writing for The Guardian, Jordan Hoffman describes Black Girl as "dazzling" and "essential viewing for the well-rounded film lover."

Awards
 1966, Prix Jean Vigo for best feature film
 1966, Tanit d'Or, Carthage Film Festival

See also
 Cinema of Senegal

References

External links
 
 
 
  At ousmanesembene.com
 Introduction at Senses of Cinema
 Slant Magazine review
 
 Black Girl: Self, Possessed an essay by Ashley Clark at the Criterion Collection
 Cinema Then, Cinema Now: Black Girl a 1994 discussion of the film hosted by Jerry Carlson of CUNY TV

1966 films
Senegalese drama films
Films directed by Ousmane Sembène
Films shot in Senegal
French drama films
1960s French-language films
Films set in Senegal
Films set on the French Riviera
French black-and-white films
Senegalese black-and-white films
Films about immigration to France
1960s French films